Badman is a British comedy drama web series that premiered on YouTube in October 2015. It has since had 13 episodes, Ten with the first series, and three thus far into the second series, as of 15 February 2023. The series is created by Humza Arshad and consists of continuous episodes uploaded on his YouTube channel Humza Productions, following the next chapter in the Diary of a Badman world. Humza is now maturing from boy to man, and takes himself down a path of darkness, but learns life's most important lessons on his journey to the light.

Development
The original music is provided by DJ Limelight, Lyan Roze and DDark.

Characters 
 Humza Arshad as Humza (Badman): The main character of the series and also the narrator of the story in each episode.
 Sayfuz Ali as Avell: Humza's friend from prison who later betrays him by stabbing Humza, but then he later joins him to get his revenge on TJ.
 Mohammed Umar Baig as Umar: Humza's best friend, often ridiculed by Humza and the group for being overweight.
 Humza Arshad also as Mr Arshad (Mr Bubblegum): Humza's father, who owned a shop called Bubblegum and later The Chewing Gums.
 Noor: Humza's sister who was shot at the end of the first series.
 Anusha Sareen as Anisa: Humza's friend from school and formerly the best friend of Yasmin.
 Zak Snoke as TJ: Humza's enemy and the main antagonist of the first season, who ruins Humza's life; he is later arrested.
 Theo Johnson as Ace: Smokey's right-hand man who is later revealed to be working for his cousin, TJ. He ends up at the top of the chain at the end of the first season, and teams up with Humza in the second season to find out who shot Humza's sister. Antagonist 
DJ Limelight as Smokey: A notorious drug dealer, who is revealed to be Avell's boss. Humza winds up working for Smokey and leading him to the location of Avell after he stabs Humza and robs one of Smokey's traphouses. He loses everything after V and Ace  kidnap him and steal his traphouses.
 Voltaire Taiwo-de-Campos as V: A businessman who kills Caesar and eventually ends up controlling all of Smokey's traphouses and weapons, to later be shot and killed by Ace on TJ's command.
Fayaaz Kassam as Fayaaz: Humza's friend.
 David Whitely as Rebeka with a 'K': Ace's informant and a snitch from Birmingham, who later becomes friends with Humza.
 Nobuse Junior as Tyrone: TJ's closest friend who learns about Yasmin's death and is presumed dead after he is betrayed and stabbed by TJ.
 Sammy T as Sammy: A dumb friend of Humza who foils nearly every plan.
 Jay Ahmed as Jay: Humza's cousin and Yasmin's boss, until she stops showing up. He is beaten up when he threatens to disclose information to the police about TJ.
Jazzie Zonzolo as Jazzie: Humza's friend (cameo appearance).
Adil Malik as Prince: V's right-hand man who is involved in a shootout against Humza when he and Avell team up to rescue Smokey from his kidnapping.

Episodes 
Created and written by Humza Arshad. Directed by Mazzi Cuzzi.

References

British comedy web series
British drama web series